Navakholo is a constituency in Kenya. It is one of twelve constituencies in Kakamega County.

Navakholo constituency comprises five county assembly wards.

 Bunyala West
 ...

References 

Constituencies in Kakamega County